Razorbill is a large bird.

Razorbill may also refer to:

Razorbill (publisher), a publishing imprint of Penguin Group
Empire Razorbill, an Empire ship
HMS Razorbill, a ship of the Coastal Forces of the Royal Navy
USCGC Razorbill (WPB-87332), a Marine Protector-class patrol boat
Razorbill, a 2006 play by Laura Ruohonen
Razorbill, an Award of Garden Merit rhododendron